Nathaniel Curtis (born 29 December 1990) is a British actor. He is best known for his role as Ash Mukherjee in the Channel 4 drama It's a Sin (2021).

Early life and education 
Curtis grew up just outside Bournemouth to an English mother and Indian father. He completed his acting degree at East 15 Acting School in Loughton, Essex in 2014.

Career 
After graduating, Curtis went five years without an acting job. One of his first acting roles was as Romeo in Romeo and Juliet for Fuller's Brewery's Shakespeare in the Garden theater series in 2019 which was nominated for an Offie award. He later played Ferdinand, Alonso, and Trinculo in the following year's production of The Tempest.

Curtis played Ash Mukherjee in It's a Sin, the Award Winning British television series developed by Russell T Davies that premiered in early 2021 on Channel 4 in the UK and on HBO Max in the United States. Curtis was named the winner on the 2021 Great British Bake Off Christmas Special after competing in baking challenges with other members of the cast of It's a Sin.

In the Summer of 2022, Curtis returned to the stage to play the title role in Britannicus at the Lyric Hammersmith Theatre.

He played the role of Brian in The Witcher: Blood Origin, a Netflix miniseries that serves as a prequel to The Witcher and was released on December 25, 2022.

Personal life 
Curtis identifies as queer and stands 6'5" tall. He has an older sister.

Stage and screen credits

Television

Theatre

Audio

Awards and nominations

References

External links

1990 births
Living people
21st-century English male actors
English male television actors
Alumni of East 15 Acting School
English LGBT actors